Chaibou Adamou is a player from Cameroon who currently plays in the Thai Division 2 League for Pattani FC.

References

Living people
1985 births
Cameroonian footballers
Association football forwards
Chaibou Adamou